is a 2014 Japanese animated action science fantasy film based on the Pretty Cure franchise created by Izumi Todo, and its eleventh series, HappinessCharge PreCure!. The film is directed by Chiaki Kon, written by Yoshimi Narita, and produced by Toei Animation. The film was released in Japanese theaters on October 11, 2014.

Plot 
One day, after Megumi, Hime, Yuko, and Iona help put on a puppet show at a nursery, they come across a living doll named Tsumugi, who claims that her homeland, the Doll Kingdom, is under Saiark attack. As the girls follow Tsumugi to the Doll Kingdom, where they fight against a Windmill Saiark, Blue, who had never heard of the Doll Kingdom before, is suddenly attacked by a darkness coming from his mirror. After defeating the Saiark, the girls are introduced to the Doll Kingdom's prince, Zeke, who Hime gets an instant crush on, and are taken to the kingdom's castle for a celebratory party. As Yuko and Iona figure there is something amiss, Seiji is ambushed by Bee Saiarks and transformed into a doll. With more Saiarks suddenly appearing, Megumi learns that Tsumugi is the one who created the fake Saiarks and led the Cures into a trap. It is revealed that Zeke and the other residents of the kingdom are all dolls belonging to Tsumugi, who loved to dance in the real world but one day lost the ability to use her legs, shutting herself off from her friends and family. She was brought into a man-made kingdom by a commander from the Phantom Empire named Black Fang, who stated that the only way she would be able to continue dancing in this kingdom is to defeat the Pretty Cures. After the Cures retreat, Megumi laments how she can't help to cure Tsumugi's legs, but the others assure her they can do something if they work together. Together, they try to show Tsumugi what she truly needs to be happy, but they are all ensnared by Black Fang, who reveals he was the one who stole Tsumugi's ability to dance in order to wield the power born from her despair. Wanting Tsumugi to remember her happiness, Zeke and the other dolls sacrifice themselves in order to free the Cures, allowing Megumi to reach Tsumugi. Stating her firm desire to help her, Megumi helps Tsugumi realize there are things besides dancing that brings her happiness and stops her flow of despair, freeing the captured Seiji and Blue in the process. Black Fang uses what despair he has collected to transform into a more powerful form, which can even block out the power of the Miracle Dress Lights Blue sends to people around the world. However, Megumi's undying determination gives Tsumugi the strength to turn her despair into hope, allowing the power of the Miracle Dress Lights to reach Megumi, who transforms into Super Happiness Lovely and defeats Black Fang alongside the other Cures. After assuring Megumi that she does have the power to make everyone happy, Tsumugi returns to the real world and regains the use of her legs, finally able to dance the way she wants again.

Characters

Happiness Charge PreCure

 Megumi Aino / Cure Lovely (Megumi Nakajima)
 Hime Shirayuki / Cure Princess (Megumi Han)
 Yuko Ōmori / Cure Honey (Rina Kitagawa)
 Iona Hikawa / Cure Fortune (Haruka Tomatsu)
 Ribbon (Naoko Matsui)
 Glasan (Miyuki Kobori)
 Blue (Shouma Yamamoto)
 Seiji Sagara (Ryōsuke Kanemoto)
 Miyo Masuko (Sachiko Kojima)
 Saiark (Takuya Matsumoto)

Guest Characters
She lost her legs' functionality by Black Fang who deceived her to stay in Doll Kingdom from Earth and he absorb her despair which to fuel his power. Ota based Tsumugi's character design on Horie herself.
He is shown to have feelings for Tsumugi.
A demonic man who created Doll Kingdom to deceive Tsumugi by making her staying there forever from Earth. He used Tsumugi's despair to fuel his power to take over the Earth but he was defeated by Cure Lovely in her Super Happiness Lovely form. As a character, he was described as "overwhelming bad guy", "zero familiarity". and "a partner who can be beaten in a row".
 as himself, appearing in the prologue "Funassyi Show", where he is attacked by a Saiark; it shakes the "Miracle Dress Light" in both the prologue and at the end of the story to cheer, and also called on the audience to cheer.

Production 
Chiaki Kon was appointed as the film's director, the first one outside of Toei Animation. Producer Hiroaki Shibata, along with character design/drawing director Kazuhiro Ota, both outside-appointed, said:

Kon was a fan of the previous Pretty Cure series, and had a dream of directing Pretty Cure. He asked Shibata to produce a performance from the previous year's DokiDoki! PreCure and became the film's director.

Yui Horie, Daisuke Ono, and Toshiyuki Morikawa voice the film-only character Tsumugi, Zeke, and Black Fang. Additionally, Funassyi, an unofficial mascot of the city of Funabashi, Chiba, appears as himself and was appointed as a support captain of this work.

The film had a large-scale tie-up with Yokohama City. In honor of the dolls being the motif of the story, a special display of doll goods was held at the Yokohama Doll House, and stamp rallies were held throughout the city. On October 5, the four seiyu attended a ceremony to light the ferris wheel at Yokohama Cosmo World pink.

At Shinjuku WALD9, a public event was held the day before the film's theatrical release. A free screening of the Futari wa Pretty Cure Max Heart film on Niconico Namahōsō to commemorate the Pretty Cure 10th anniversary; this was the first time a Pretty Cure work was screened there.

Reception 
It was released on 210 screens nationwide, and in its first two days (October 11 and 12), 85,396 people attended the film. With a revenue of ¥1389600, this was the first time Kōgyō Tsūshin ranked a Pretty Cure film at fifth-place in film attendance. In addition, it ranked #2 in the first-day satisfaction ranking by Pia's survey. However, box office revenues were sluggish, with the final office revenue ending at ¥530 million.。

It was analyzed by Otapol and Itmedia'''s Netolab division that several issues hindered people from splitting income for the film, thus causing the film's box-office decline:
It was released during the consecutives holidays in early-October instead of the usual late-October;
It was released at the same time as athletic meet season and the approach and landing of Typhoon Vongfong;
The massive success of Frozen in Japan;
Two popular anime - Yo-kai Watch and Aikatsu! - had successful film adaptations during the 2014 holiday season.『映画キラキラ☆プリキュアアラモード パリッと！想い出のミルフィーユ！』小ネタ満載で実にコミカル！終始笑いと感動の大傑作だった！ , おたぽる,2017年11月6日

 Music 
The opening song is HappinessCharge PreCure! WOW!, sung by Sayaka Nakaya, and the ending song is Party Has Come.

 Single 

 is an insert song of the anime film HappinessCharge PreCure! the Movie: The Ballerina of the Land of Dolls released on October 11, 2014. It is sung by four Cures (Nakajima, Han, Kitagawa, and Tomatsu) appearing in the film.

The single was released from Marvelous on October 8. The B-Side is the image song "If You Look to the Blue Sky" by Megumi Aino (Nakajima) and movie-only character Tsumugi (Yui Horie).

 Overview 
Producer Hiroaki Shibata wanted to make another Pretty Cure insert song like with DokiDoki! Precure the Movie: Mana's Getting Married!!? The Dress of Hope Tied to the Future the previous year. Director Chiaki Kon agreed to this, and decided to use a song that would heat up the climax battle scene like with Sailor Moon R: The Movies "Moon Revenge". He also specifically ordered composer Hiroshi Takaki to make the song "contemporary style with a hot feeling".

The songs were recorded in the order of Tomatsu, Nakajima, Kitagawa, and Han. Although they were not asked which scene they were used for after-recording of animation, they were immediately used in which scene when they read the lyrics.
Tomatsu said: "It's very cool that there are many talks, or there are many overlapping ones."
Nakajima said: "'Shiawase wo akiramenai!' was a lovely line in the play as it is in the lyrics, and it made it so crowded."
Kitagawa said: "I felt that while I was singing, I thought that a slightly different [Cure] Honey could be seen from this song."
Han said: "The message that [Cure] Princess told in the film is the same song [...] It is something that four people sing and can not sing without one. [It is] a song that everyone sings together."中島愛、潘めぐみ、北川里奈がドレスアップして『映画プリキュア！』史上初の前夜祭イベントに出席！ ,テレビドガッチ,2014年10月11日

Horie said of If You Look to the Blue Sky:

The single topped at #59 in the Oricon Singles Chart on October 20, 2014.

 Track listing 
  (5:01)
 Sung by: Cure Lovely (Megumi Nakajima); Cure Princess (Megumi Han); Cure Honey (Rina Kitagawa); Cure Fortune (Haruka Tomatsu)
 Lyrics： Masaori Koda
 Work and Arrangement： Hiroshi Takaki
 Insert song of HappinessCharge PreCure! the Movie: The Ballerina of the Land of Dolls
 Later used as a song in episode 44 of the main series.
 ''' (4:56)
 Sung by: Cure Lovely (Megumi Nakajima); Tsumugi (Yui Horie)
 Lyrics: Sumiyo Mutsumi
 Work and Arrangement: Hiroshi Takaki
  (5:01)
  (4:56)

Soundtrack 
The film's original soundtrack was released on October 11, 2014. Hiroshi Takaki recorded the soundtrack. In addition, the movie-sized theme song is included. A jacket-size sticker was bundled as a first-time limited-time offer. It topped at #254 at the Oricon Albums Chart on October 20, 2014.

Home media 
The film's DVD/BD was released on March 18, 2015. On March 30 the special-version DVD and regular-version DVD charted at 55 and 139 in the Oricon DVD Chart, while the BR charted at 28 in the Blu-ray Disc Chart.

References

External links 
  
 

2014 anime films
Pretty Cure films
Toei Animation films
2010s Japanese films
Films about disability
Films about dolls
Films about sentient toys
Animated films about extraterrestrial life
Japanese animated science fiction films
2010s science fiction films
Supernatural science fiction films
Films directed by Chiaki Kon